Robert Forbes Woodward (October 1, 1908 – May 18, 2001) was an American diplomat who focused on U.S. relations with Latin America.

Biography
Robert F. Woodward was born in Minneapolis on October 1, 1908. He was educated at the University of Minnesota, receiving a B.A. in 1930.

Woodward joined the United States Foreign Service in 1931.  As a Foreign Service Officer, he served in Winnipeg 1932-33; in Buenos Aires 1933-36; in Bogotá 1936-37; and in Rio de Janeiro 1937-39.  He then returned to work for the United States Department of State in Washington, D.C., serving as Assistant Chief of the Division of American Republics 1941-42.  He then returned to the field, serving in La Paz 1943-44; in Guatemala 1944-45; and in Havana 1945-47.  From 1947 to 1949, he was back in Washington, D.C. as Deputy Director of the Office of American Republic Affairs.  In 1950, he returned to the field with a posting in Stockholm, where he served until 1952.  He then returned to Washington to serve as Chief of the Division of Foreign Service Personnel 1952-53 and as Deputy Assistant Secretary of State for Inter-American Affairs 1953-54.

In 1954, President of the United States Dwight D. Eisenhower nominated Woodward as United States Ambassador to Costa Rica.  Woodward presented his credentials on December 3, 1954 and served in this post until March 15, 1958.  Eisenhower then appointed him as United States Ambassador to Uruguay and he held this post from April 21, 1958 through March 29, 1961.  (On a sidenote, Ambassador Woodward was a longtime advocate in favor of creation of the Inter-American Development Bank, which was created in 1960.)  President John F. Kennedy then named him United States Ambassador to Chile, though he held this post for only two months, from May 5, 1961 to July 6, 1961.

In the wake of the failed Bay of Pigs Invasion in April 1961, Kennedy nominated Woodward as Assistant Secretary of State for Inter-American Affairs and Woodward held this office from July 17, 1961 through March 17, 1962.  As Assistant Secretary led a successful effort to have Cuba suspended from membership in the Organization of American States.  He was also the architect of the first meeting of the Alliance for Progress, a centerpiece of the Kennedy Administration's Latin America policy post-Bay of Pigs.

Kennedy next named Woodward United States Ambassador to Spain, with Woodward serving from May 10, 1962 through February 1, 1965.

Woodward retired in 1965. He died of heart failure at his home in Washington, D.C. on May 18, 2001, at the age of 92.

References
Christopher Marquis, "Robert F. Woodward, 92; Was Envoy to Latin America", New York Times, May 22, 2001

1908 births
2001 deaths
United States Assistant Secretaries of State
People from Minneapolis
University of Minnesota alumni
Ambassadors of the United States to Costa Rica
Ambassadors of the United States to Uruguay
Ambassadors of the United States to Chile
Ambassadors of the United States to Spain
United States Foreign Service personnel
20th-century American diplomats